is a retired Japanese Wrestler and Judoka. She won six gold medals and one silver medal in three weight classes (65, 70, and 75 kg) at the World Wrestling Championships from 1990 to 1996.

Biography
After entering Nippon Sport Science University, she started Judo. She became captain of the Judo club and won the 61 kg weight class at the Tokyo University Championships. Furthermore, she also started Wrestling at the suggestion of Miyuu Yamamoto's father, Ikuei Yamamoto, who was a coach of the university wrestling team.
In 1990, two years after starting wrestling, she won her first World Championships in the 75kg weight class.
In 1991, she won the 70 kg weight class at the World Championships in Tokyo. She was second at the 1992 World Wrestling Championships, but won for the third time at the 1993 World Wrestling Championships. She then moved down to the 65kg weight class and won the World Championships for three consecutive years starting in 1994.
She was with the sushi company , but when the company went bankrupt, she went to Canada to study at the University of Alberta. There she married Japanese-Canadian wrestler Odagaki. Then she retired, partly due to a knee injury.
In 2007, she became the second woman to be inducted into the UWW (then FILA) Hall of Fame.
in 2013, Urano became a member of the UWW (then FILA) Women and Sport Commission.

References

External links
 

1969 births
Living people
Japanese female sport wrestlers
Japanese female judoka
World Wrestling Championships medalists
Asian Wrestling Championships medalists
20th-century Japanese women